Bomb the Rocks: Early Days Singles 1989–1996 is a compilation by the 5.6.7.8's which was released in 2003.

Track listing
 "Bomb the Twist"
 "Jane in the Jungle"
 "Three Cool Chicks"
 "Guitar Date"
 "Woo Hoo"
 "Dream Boy"
 "Continental Hop"
 "Jump Jack, Jump"
 "Smilly Willy"
 "Mr. Lee"
 "It's Rainy"
 "Road Runner"
 "My Boyfriend from Outer Space"
 "She Was a Mau Mau"
 "Long Tall Sally"
 "Scream"
 "Hot Generation"
 "Bond Girl"
 "Fruit Bubble Love"
 "Motor Cycle Go-Go-Go"
 "Jet Coaster"
 "The 5.6.7.8's"
 "Edie Is a Sweet Candy"
 "I Was a Teenage Cave Woman"
 "Ah-So"
 "Pinball Party"
 "Blue Radio"
 "Oriental Rock"

References

The 5.6.7.8's albums
2003 compilation albums
Garage rock compilation albums
Punk rock albums by Japanese artists
Punk rock compilation albums
Compilation albums by Japanese artists